Tahir al-Jaza'iri (1852 CE/1268 AH – 1920 CE/1338 AH) was a 19th century Syrian Muslim scholar and educational reformer and a great scholar of Tafsīr, Ḥadīth, Fiqh, Uṣūl, history and the Arabic language.

Biography 
Tahir al-Jaza'iri was born in 1852 in Damascus to an academic family of the Sam'un Amazigh tribe of Algeria. His father, Muhammad Salih, a mufti of the Maliki school of jurisprudence, had migrated from Algeria to Damascus in 1846.

Tahir studied with his father until the latter's death around 1868, after which he studied under Abd al-Ghani Al-Maydani, Abd ar-Rahman al-Bustani, and Abd ar-Rahman al-Bushnaqi at the  next to the Umayyad Mosque.

Tahir al-Jazairi was interested in Arabic and in Arabic literature, particularly old manuscripts. His mastery of Persian was comparable to his mastery of Arabic, and he was also proficient in Ottoman Turkish. He also studied French, Hebrew, Syriac, Ethiopian, several ancient Semitic languages, and Tamazight, though he did not master these.

At the age of 22, he started teaching at al-Madrasa al-Zahiriyeh in Damascus. Under the reforms of the governor Midhat Pasha, al-Jazairi became inspector of education. According to Muḥammad Kurd ʿAlī, al-Jazairi also designed curricula for elementary education and wrote the necessary textbooks, in topics including Arabic grammar, ethics, religion, and history. Under Midhat Pasha, al-Jazairi also founded Dar al-Kutub az-Zahiriyah, the library of the Az-Zahiriyah Madrasa, with manuscripts he collected from around Damascus. He then established Khalidi Library in Jerusalem in the name of Sheikh Raghib al-Khalidi of the Khalidi family.

In 1902, he was dismissed from his position as inspector of libraries. Under continued pressure from Ottoman authorities, he left for Cairo in 1905 where he associated with Ahmad Zaki Pasha and Ahmed Taymour Pasha. In Cairo, he supported himself as a book merchant, dealing in valuable manuscripts. He remained in Cairo for about thirteen years and in 1920 he became seriously ill, and he returned to Damascus. One of his pupils during this period was Muhib Al Din Al Khatib who would be a significant figure for the Salafi movement in Egypt. Soon after his return he was elected as a member of the Arabic Academy in Damascus and the Director of the Ẓāhirīyyah Library. He passed away four months later in 1920 and was buried on the Qāsiyūn Mountain in Damascus, Syria.

Legacy
Joseph H. Escovitz noted, writing in 1986, that there had been no study of him in English and that even the Encyclopaedia of Islam had no mention of him.

Shaykh Muḥammad Saʿīd al-Bānī al-Dimashqī, Muḥammad Kurd ʿAlī, Shaykh ʿAlī al-Ṭanṭāwī, and Shaykh ʿAdnān al-Khaṭīb and others revered him and wrote about Shaykh Ṭāhir’s productive life and distinct personality. Muhammad Kurd Ali described him as the Muhammad Abduh of Syria, while Hisham Sharabi called him "the leading spirit of Islamic reformism in Syria."

Works 

Shaykh Ṭāhir wrote many books over thirty-five in number on various subjects. These include ʿAqīdah, ʿUlūm al-Qur’ān, Tajwīd, the science of Ḥadīth, Sīrah, Uṣūl, Arabic rhetoric, Arabic literature, the philosophy of natural mathematics, history and an introduction to many Islamic manuscripts. His most important books are listed below.

In the Islamic Sciences 

  in the Quranic sciences.
  in the science of Ḥadīth. Shaykh Abd al-Fattah Abu Ghudda describes this as one of the most extensive works on the subject.
  in ʿAqīdah (Islamic theology).

On the Arabic Language 

  in teaching/learning the Arabic Language at the primary-school level.
  in Arabic Grammar.
  - a summary of " by Ibn Qutaybah.

In Poetry and Literature 

 .
 .
 مراقي علم الأدب
 تسهيل المجاز إلى فني المعمّى والألغاز
 التقريب إلى أصول التعريب
 روضة العقلاء لابن حبّان
 الأدب والمروءة لصالح بن جناح

Others 

  on Mathematics education at the primary-school level.
  - a collection of articles on various topics.
 

Some of his works are still manuscripts that have never been published. Some of the titles are:

 .
 .
 Selections from az-Zarrūq’s work in Taṣawwuf.

References 

1852 births
1920 deaths
19th-century imams
20th-century imams
19th-century Arabs
20th-century Arabs
People from Damascus
19th-century Muslim scholars of Islam
Atharis
20th-century Muslim scholars of Islam
Arab Sunni Muslim scholars of Islam